Rain is a type of precipitation in which liquid drops of water fall toward the surface of the earth.

Rain, The Rain, or RAIN may also refer to:

Characters
 Rain (Mortal Kombat), a character in the Mortal Kombat fighting games
 Rain, a character in the Elfquest comic book series
 Rain, a horse in Spirit: Stallion of the Cimarron
 Rain, a character in Sword Art Online: Lost Song

Computing
 Redundant Array of Independent Nodes, a computing architecture

Film and television

Films
 Rain (1929 film), a Dutch short film by Joris Ivens
 Rain (1932 film), a drama starring Joan Crawford; based on the 1921 Somerset Maugham short story
 Rain (2001 film), a New Zealand drama by Christine Jeffs
 Baran (film) or Rain, a 2001 Iranian film
 Rain (2005 film) or Rain: The Terror Within..., a Bollywood erotic thriller
 Rain (2006 film), a film starring Faye Dunaway
 Rain (2008 film), a Bahamian film starring C. C. H. Pounder
 Rain, a 2013 adaptation of the video game Heavy Rain
 Rain (2020 film), an Estonian film of 2020
 The Rain (film), a 1976 Bangladeshi film

Television
 Dozhd or Rain, a Russian television channel
 Rain (TV series), an Indonesian soap opera musical comedy drama
 "Rain" (CSI: NY), an episode of CSI: NY
 The Rain (TV series), a 2018 Danish Netflix television series

Literature
 Rain (poetry collection), a 2009 book by Don Paterson
 "Rain" (short story), a 1921 short story by W. Somerset Maugham
 Rain, a 2000 novel by V. C. Andrews
 Rain, a 1994 novel by Kirsty Gunn
 The Rain, a 1988 mystery novel by Keith Peterson

Music

Classical music
Rain (opera), an opera by Richard Owen
Rain, choral composition by Clare Maclean
Rain, a 2001 ballet by the Rosas Company

Groups
 Rain (American band), a post-hardcore band
 Rain (British band), a rock band from Liverpool
 Rain (Japanese band), an instrumental rock band
 Rain: A Tribute to the Beatles, a 1975 Beatles tribute band and show
 Rain, a late 1960s California-based group formed by members of The Dartells
 The Rain (Basingstoke band), later Clark Springs, an indie band from Basingstoke, England
 The Rain (Manchester band), a band from Manchester, England, that eventually evolved into Oasis

Albums
 Rain (EP), a 2000 EP by 40 Below Summer
 Rain (Peter Mulvey album), 1994
 Rain (Joe Jackson album), 2008
 Rain (Sons of Korah album), 2008

 The Rain (album), a 2003 album by Ghazal
 The Rain, a 2009 album by Z-Ro and Chill

Songs
  "Rain" (Aitch and AJ Tracey song) (2020)
 "Rain" (Anthony Callea song) (2005)
 "Rain" (Beatles song) (1966)
 "Rain" (Breaking Benjamin song) (2005)
 "Rain" (Creed song) (2009)
 "Rain" (The Cult song) (1985)
 "Rain" (Dragon song) (1983)
 "Rain" (Erasure song) (1997)
 "Rain" (Guano Apes song) (1998)
 "Rain (Let the Children Play)", a 1994 song by Marcia Hines from Right Here and Now
 "Rain" (Madonna song) (1993)
 "Rain" (Man in the Wood song) (1989)
 "Rain" (Mika song) (2009)
 "Rain" (The Script song) (2017)
 "Rain" (SWV song) (1997)
 "Rain" (Soyou and Baekhyun song) (2017)
 "Rain" (Status Quo song) (1976)
 "Rain" (Taeyeon song) (2016)
 "Rain Song" (Taiji song)
 "Rain" (Uriah Heep song) (1972)
 "Rain" (Yui song) (2010)
 "Rain", a 2007 song by Bishop Allen from The Broken String
 "Rain", a 2011 song by Amaranthe from Amaranthe
 "Rain", a 2009 song by Anjulie from Anjulie
 "Rain", a 2002 song by Audiovent from Dirty Sexy Knights in Paris
 "Rain", a 2008 song by Simone Battle
 "Rain", a 1989 song by Blake Babies from Earwig
 "Rain", a 1998 song by Brainbug
 "Rain", a 1987 song by Michael Breen
 "Rain", a 2005 song by Chamillionaire from The Sound of Revenge
 "Rain", a 2005 song by Charon from Songs for the Sinners
 "Rain", a 1987 song by the Chills from Brave Words
 "Rain", a 2019 song by Tusse Chiza
 "Rain", a 2000 song by the Clientele from Suburban Light
 "Rain", a 1993 song by Concrete Blonde from Mexican Moon
 "Rain (Jacques)", a 2007 song by Stewart Copeland from The Stewart Copeland Anthology
 "Rain", a 2000 song by the Corrs from In Blue
 "Rain", a 1987 song by Terence Trent D'Arby from Introducing the Hardline According to Terence Trent D'Arby
 "Rain", a 2007 song by Dear Jayne
 "Rain", a 1993 song by Debbie Harry from Debravation
 "Rain", a 2001 song by Detroit Grand Pubahs from Funk All Y'all
 "Rain", a 2003 song by DJ Muggs from Dust
 "Rain", a 2004 song by E-Type from Loud Pipes Save Lives
 "Rain", a 1993 song by An Emotional Fish from Junk Puppets
 "Rain", a 2003 song by Emyli
 "Rain", a song by José Feliciano, covered by Bruce Ruffin
 "Rain", a 2005 song by Fool's Garden from Ready for the Real Life
 "Rain", a 2002 song by Gackt from Moon
 "Rain", a 1994 song by Glay from Hai to Diamond
 "Rain", a 2003 song by Green Carnation from A Blessing in Disguise
 "Rain", a 2002 song by Patty Griffin from 1000 Kisses
 "Rain", a song by Harem Scarem from Karma Cleansing
 "Rain", a 2006 song by Heather Headley from In My Mind
 "Rain", a song by Hollywood Undead from Notes from the Underground
 "Rain", a 1997 song by Kiss from Carnival of Souls: The Final Sessions
 "Rain", a 2007 song by Lord from Ascendence
 "Rain", a 1997 song by Muse from Newton Abbot Demo
 "Rain", a 2019 song by Ben Platt
 "Rain", a 1981 song by Prism from Small Change
 "Rain", a 2013 song by Project Pitchfork from Black
 "Rain", a 1995 song by Riot from The Brethren of the Long House
 "Rain", a 1996 song by Samael from Passage
 "Rain", a 1993 song by Scream from Fumble
 "Rain", a 1998 song by the Seatbelts from Cowboy Bebop
 "Rain", a 1995 song by Siam Shade from Siam Shade II
 "Rain", a 2005 song by Shadow Gallery from Room V
 "Rain", a 2005 song by Trivium from Ascendancy
 "Rain", a 1972 song by Uriah Heep from The Magician's Birthday
 "Rain", a song by Keke Wyatt from Ke'Ke'
 "The Rain" (Oran "Juice" Jones song) (1986)
 "The Rain Song", a song by Led Zeppelin
 "The Rain (Supa Dupa Fly)", a song by Missy Elliott
 "The Rain", a song by Akon from Konvicted
 "The Rain", a song by Carlene Carter from Little Love Letters
 "The Rain", a song by DMX from Grand Champ
 "The Rain", a song by God Forbid from Earthsblood
 "The Rain", a song by Montell Jordan from Montell Jordan
 "The Rain", a song by K-Os from Atlantis: Hymns for Disco
 "The Rain", a song by Knocked Loose from Laugh Tracks
 "The Rain", a song by Peter Luts
 "The Rain", a song by Roxette from Tourism
 "The Rain", a song by Kate Ryan from Stronger
 "The Rain", a song by Lou Rhodes from Bloom
 "The Rain", a song by Will Smith from Willennium
 "The Rain", a song by Tech N9ne from Everready (The Religion)

People
 Rain (entertainer) (born 1982), South Korean pop artist and actor
 Rain (eSports) (born 1994), Norwegian CS:GO player
 Rain (wrestler) (born 1981), American wrestler

Places
 Rain, Lower Bavaria, Bavaria, Germany
 Rain, Swabia, Bavaria, Germany
 Rain, Iran, a village in North Khorasan Province, Iran
 Rain, Lucerne, Switzerland
 Rain, Kentucky, an unincorporated community in Whitley County, Kentucky
 Rain, Raebareli, a village in Uttar Pradesh, India

Other uses
 Rain (Van Gogh), an 1889 painting by Vincent Van Gogh
 Rain (video game), a 2013 PlayStation game
 Rain (webcomic), a 2010-2022 slice-of-life webcomic by Jocelyn Samara DiDomenick
 Rain (telecommunications), a South African telecommunications company
 RAIN, a charitable organisation in Bronx, New York, founded by a former nurse at Parkchester General Hospital

People with the surname
 Douglas Rain (1928–2018), Canadian actor and narrator
 Gavin Rain (born 1971), South African artist
 Justin Rain (born 1981), Canadian First Nations actor

Fictional
 John Rain, a character in novels by Barry Eisler

People with the given name
 Rain (given name)

Fictional
 Rain Hasumi, a character from Valkyrie Drive – Mermaid
 Rain Mikamura, a character in Mobile Fighter G Gundam media
 Rain Lao, a character in the film Independence Day: Resurgence
 Rain Ocampo, a character in the film Resident Evil
 Rain Robinson, a character from the Star Trek: Voyager episode "Future's End"

See also
 Raein, an Italian screamo band
 Rain City (disambiguation)
 Rain song (disambiguation)
 Raine (disambiguation)
 Raines (disambiguation)
 RAINN, Rape, Abuse and Incest National Network
 Rains (disambiguation)
 Rane (disambiguation)
 Rayne (disambiguation)
 Reign (disambiguation)
 Rein (disambiguation)